The 2022 Vivo Pro Kabaddi League was the ninth season of Pro Kabaddi League. The season began on 7 October 2022. The tournament was played across Bengaluru, Pune and Hyderabad while the playoffs were played in Mumbai.
Each team played against all the other teams twice, and the top 6 teams proceeded to the playoffs. The player auction for season 9 was conducted on 5 August 2022 in Mumbai. 

The fixtures of the tournament were announced on 21 September 2022 and 11 October 2022 for the remaining tournament. Jaipur Pink Panthers defeated Puneri Paltan in the final match to win their second title.

Teams

Personnel and sponsorships 
Note: Table lists in alphabetical order.

Foreign players
Each team can sign a maximum of 3 foreign players to the squad.

Sponsorship
Title Sponsor

 Vivo

Associate Sponsors

 Tata Motors
 Dream11
 MFine
 A23
 BYJU'S
 Mutual Funds

Partners

 Parimatch News
 Officer's Choice
 Dhani
 UltraTech Cement

Broadcast Sponsor
 Star Sports

Digital Streaming Partner
 Disney+ Hotstar

Viewership

Points table

League Stage

Leg 1 – Kanteerava Indoor Stadium, Bangalore

Leg 2 – Shree Shiv Chhatrapati Sports Complex, Pune

Leg 3 – Gachibowli Indoor Stadium, Hyderabad

Playoffs

Eliminator 1

Eliminator 2

Semi Final 1

Semi Final 2

Final

Statistics

Most Raid Points

Most Tackle Points

Total Points

References

Pro Kabaddi League seasons
Pro Kabaddi League